Dina (Punjabi and ), also known as the gateway of Kashmir is a city in Jhelum District of Punjab the province of Pakistan. Dina is one of the oldest towns in Punjab.

According to  2017 census, the Dina had a population of 56,885 of which 31.48% were urban. Dina provided many soldiers to the British and later the Pakistan armed forces and is known as city of soldiers or land of martyrs and warriors.

Location
Dina is located near Pothohar Plateau, in the north of the Punjab province. It is heart of Jhelum district. It is bordered by Jhelum and Sohawa to its south, Rohtas City to its south west, Garh Mahal to its south and east, Mirpur to its east, Chakwal to its west, Mangla Cantt to its north east, and Domeli to its north. The district of Jhelum stretches from the River Jhelum almost to the Indus. Nearby villages include Said hussain,Mota Gharbi, Khukha, Gaggar Kalan, Gaggar Khurd , Natain, Khojki, Dhok Padhal and Dhok Gujral.

The historic Grand Trunk Road passes through the centre of the city.

Economy
There is limited industrial activity including woodworking, ironworking and marble processing. The main source of income for residents is remittances from relatives working in the UK and the Persian Gulf region. Many residents join the Pakistan Army. Most of the people's are Gujjar & Jutt. There is some small-scale agriculture with wheat and pulses as the main crops.

Salt is quarried at the Mayo mine in the Salt Range hills. The chief centre of the salt trade is Pind Dadan Khan. There are two coal mines in the district that supply the North-Western Railway. They are the only working coal mines in Punjab province.

History
Dina is the nearest town to the Pothohar Plateau , Mirpur which is rich in archaeological sites of the ancient Soanian culture.

Culture
The main languages spoken in Dina are Punjabi and Urdu. English is widely understood.

Several poets and famous personalities were born in Dina, the popular Pakistani poet Zamir Jafri and the Indian poet Gulzar. Gulzar wrote the following lines for his birthplace:

Transport

The district is crossed by the main line of the North-Western railway of Pakistan Railways, and traversed along the south by a branch line.
The district us also crossed by main road N5.

Education
Farabi Foundation school
Punjab College
Reformer School System
NLC
Fauji Foundation School
Bukhari College
Govt. Higher Secondary School
Govt. College
Govt. Fatima Jinnah Degree College For Women
Govt. High School Mian Mohalla
Saracens Foundation High School
The Educators
Dar e Arqam
Aspire Collage Gt road Dina

Notable people
 Gulzar, Indian film director, lyricist and poet
 Fawad Chaudhry, Former Minister of Information and Broadcasting (Pakistan)
 Chaudhry Altaf Hussain, former Governor of Punjab and member of the National Assembly of Pakistan
 Zamir Jafri, poet

References

Populated places in Jhelum District
Jhelum District